The 2005 Vanderbilt Commodores football team represented Vanderbilt University in the 2005 NCAA Division I-A football season.  The Commodores offense scored 299 points while the defense allowed 321 points. Led by head coach Bobby Johnson in his 4th year, the Commodores won their first four games of the season but finished the season with only five wins.

This was Jay Cutler's senior year. The leading receiver was Earl Bennett. Also on the team: Jonathan Goff, Thomas Welch and Chris Williams.

Vanderbilt started out with 4 wins and looked to make it 5 for the first time since the 1940s with a win over in state MTSU. The game was close and down to the last play of the game, but a failed Vanderbilt field goal attempt allowed MTSU to come away with the win. Vanderbilt then proceeded to drop its next 5 games and fall out of Bowl eligibility.

Positively, the season ended on a high-note as Vanderbilt recorded its first win over the rival Tennessee Volunteers since 1982- and their first win at Tennessee's Neyland Stadium since 1975- by defeating the Volunteers 28-24 on November 19. Vanderbilt's historic victory eliminated Tennessee from Bowl eligibility. Jay Cutler was later named SEC Offensive Player of the Year and drafted 11th overall by the Denver Broncos in the 2006 NFL Draft the following Spring.

Schedule

Team players drafted into the NFL

References

Vanderbilt
Vanderbilt Commodores football seasons
Vanderbilt Commodores football